Mui-mui Lam (January 17, 1912 – January 5, 1968) is a former Chinese actress from Hong Kong. Lam is credited with over 250 films.

Early life 
Lam was born on 17 January 1912.

Career 
In 1933, Lam began acting in Hong Kong films. Lam first appeared in Conscience, a 1933 drama directed by Chow Wing-Loi and Mak Siu-Ha. Lam appeared as a wealthy lady in The White Gold Dragon, Part Two, a 1937 Cantonese opera film. Lam is known for her role as a shrew concubine or a wicked woman. Lam appeared as elder daughter-in-law in Mother and Son in Grief (1951), as a concubine in The Story of Liang Kuan and Lin Shirong (aka Leung Foon and Lam Sai-Wing) (1955), and Pleasure Daughter (1956). Lam also appeared in Cantonese Drama, Comedy, and Romance films. Lam's last film was The Reunion, a 1962 Historical Drama film directed by Ng Wui. Lam is credited with over 250 films.

Filmography

Films 
This is a partial list of films.
 1933 Conscience
 1937 The White Gold Dragon, Part Two - wealthy lady 
 1939 Chuang Tzu Tests His Wife (aka Chuang Tzu's Butterfly Dream) 
 1951 Mother and Son in Grief - Elder daughter-in-law 
 1953 In the Face of Demolition
 1953 Family (aka The Family - The "Torrents" Trilogy 《激流三部曲》 by Ba Jin) 
 1953 Spring (second novel of the Trilogy) 
 1954 Autumn (third novel of the Trilogy) 
 1955 The Story of Liang Kuan and Lin Shirong (aka Leung Foon and Lam Sai-Wing) - concubine 
 1956 Pleasure Daughter 
 1956 Madam Mei 
 1962 The Reunion

Personal life 
Lam died on 5 January 1968 in Hong Kong.

References

External links 
 Mui-Mui Lam at imdb.com
 Lam Mui Mui at hkcinemagic.com
 Lam Mui Mui at senscritique.com

1912 births
1968 deaths
Hong Kong film actresses